No Going Back is a folk/rock album by Johnny Coppin released in 1979, his second solo album.

The album was produced by Johnny Coppin and engineered by John Acock and Mick Dolan. It was recorded at Millstream Studios, Cheltenham during the summer of 1979. It includes contributions from Coppin's road band members of the time, plus guests including former Decameron colleague Dik Cadbury.

No Going Back was originally released by Rola Records as a vinyl LP, catalogue number R002 with sleeve artwork by Tony Price Studios and photography by Kenneth Griffiths. It has never been released on CD, though some tracks have appeared on subsequent Coppin compilations.

Track listing 
(All composed by Johnny Coppin)
 "No Going Back"
 "Can You Feel It"
 "Young Girl Town"
 "Falling For You"
 "Run To Her"
 "Part In My Heart"
 "Believe In You"
 "Birmingham"
 "He Will Let You Know"
 "We Shall Not Pass"

Personnel 
Johnny Coppin - lead vocals, acoustic guitar, keyboards
Phil Beer - violin, guitar, vocals
Tony Bennett - lead guitar, Spanish guitar, vocals
Mick Candler - drums, percussion, vocals
Steve Hutt - bassguitar, vocals

with

Mick Dolan - guitar
Pete "Bimbo" Acock - saxophone
Chris Richardson - keyboards
Anthony Head - backing vocals
Regine Candler - backing vocals
Gilly Elkins - backing vocals
Gilly Darby - backing vocals
Dik Cadbury - backing vocals

1979 albums
Johnny Coppin albums